Selja River Landscape Conservation Area is a nature park which is located in Lääne-Viru County, Estonia.

The area of the nature park is 643 ha.

The protected area was founded in 1978 to protect Selja River Ancient Valley and Karepa-Rutja coastal formations and its surrounding areas.

References

Nature reserves in Estonia
Geography of Lääne-Viru County